Derek John McInnes (born 5 July 1971) is a Scottish professional football manager and former player who is the manager of Scottish Premiership club Kilmarnock. He featured prominently for Greenock Morton, Rangers, West Bromwich Albion and Dundee United during his playing career. He won two caps for the Scotland national football team while with West Brom.

McInnes became manager of St Johnstone where he had been on the playing staff, in November 2007. He guided the club to promotion to the Scottish Premier League in 2009 and retained that status for two seasons. McInnes was appointed manager of Football League Championship club Bristol City in October 2011. Despite avoiding relegation in 2011–12, McInnes was sacked by Bristol City in January 2013 with the club bottom of the Championship. He was appointed Aberdeen manager in March 2013 but was sacked eight years later in March 2021, having won the Scottish League Cup in 2014, finished Scottish Premiership runners-up on four occasions and reached three other cup finals during his spell in charge. In January 2022 McInnes was appointed manager of Kilmarnock on an 18-month deal, succeeding previous manager Tommy Wright.

Playing career

Early career
McInnes began his professional career in 1988 as a teenager at Greenock Morton, where he played in 259 games in all competitions over nine seasons and credited the influence of assistant manager John McMaster, before moving to Rangers, where he spent almost five years as a squad player, taking part in 52 matches for the Ibrox club; his main achievement was winning the Scottish Cup in 1999 to clinch a domestic treble. McInnes scored four goals for Rangers, with strikes against FC Alania Vladikavkaz in the Champions League and Hearts in the league. He also scored twice against Ayr United and Dunfermline in Rangers' run to the 1996 Scottish League Cup Final, but he did not feature in the final itself.

During his time in Glasgow, McInnes had a loan spell at English club Stockport County, where he made 13 league appearances. He was also briefly at French side Toulouse during a season in which the club was promoted from the second division, although he only featured in three league matches.

West Bromwich Albion
McInnes joined West Bromwich Albion in the summer of 2000, but a cruciate ligament injury ended his season in October. He returned the following season to captain West Brom to a place in the Premier League. He also won West Brom's Goal of the Season award at the end of the promotion campaign, for his 25-yard strike against Sheffield United in the Battle of Bramall Lane.

McInnes was the first West Brom player to be sent off in the Premier League. He was dismissed in the second half of the club's first Premier League match against Manchester United at Old Trafford in August 2002. He played in the majority of West Brom's Premier League games during the 2002–03 season but was unable to prevent them from being relegated. He made 88 league appearances and scored six times for the West Midlands club.

Dundee United
McInnes joined Dundee United on 11 July 2003, and was immediately installed as team captain by manager Ian McCall. In his first full season at Tannadice, McInnes missed only three league and one cup game. He helped the club to a fifth-place finish in the Scottish Premier League and scored twice—his first coming in the Scottish Cup against Dunfermline and his second in a league match against Hearts. After an unsteady start to the 2004–05 season, McInnes began to take control again in the centre of midfield. He then picked up an injury with a third of the season remaining but managed to return to the first team for the Scottish Cup final at the end of the season.

In April 2006, United manager Craig Brewster announced that McInnes was free to leave the club at the end of the season, despite having a year of his contract left to run. He made 83 appearances for Dundee United, with four goals scored.

Millwall
On 24 June 2006, it was announced that McInnes had finally come to an agreement to be released from his contract and he subsequently joined Millwall. The then-Lions boss Nigel Spackman gave McInnes the captain's armband with the comment: "Every Millwall player on that pitch should be a Derek McInnes." McInnes scored once during his spell with Millwall, his goal coming in a 3–2 defeat to Cheltenham on 26 August 2006.

St Johnstone
McInnes left Millwall on a free transfer during the January 2007 transfer window, returning to Scotland to sign for St Johnstone late on New Year's Day. He made his debut for the Perth club on 6 January, against Ayr United in the Scottish Cup at McDiarmid Park.

International
International recognition came late to McInnes as he made his Scotland debut on 21 August 2002, coming on as a substitute for the last ten minutes against Denmark in a friendly. Three months later, against Portugal, he was a substitute once again, coming on midway through the first half.

Managerial career

St Johnstone 
McInnes was appointed manager of St Johnstone on 27 November 2007, after the previous management team of Owen Coyle and Sandy Stewart had departed for Burnley. On 2 May 2009, McInnes secured promotion to the Scottish Premier League for St Johnstone, ending their seven-year stint in the First Division.

During the 2009–10 close season, McInnes was linked with the managerial positions at West Bromwich Albion and Watford. He remained at St Johnstone, however, and in October 2009 he signed a new contract with the Perth club.

McInnes was granted permission by St Johnstone to be interviewed by Bristol City for their managerial position, alongside former Barnsley manager Mark Robins and another unnamed candidate, in October 2011. His managerial record with the Perth club was 177 games in charge, where he won 71 games, drew 53 games and lost 53 games.

Bristol City 
McInnes was appointed manager of Bristol City on 19 October 2011. The club were adrift at the bottom of the Football League Championship, but McInnes guided City to an eight-game unbeaten run that secured their league status.

On 6 November 2012, following City's 2–0 loss to Birmingham City, McInnes gave £300 to 17 stranded fans who had their minibus tyres slashed outside St Andrew's Stadium.

During the 2012–13 season, Bristol City suffered a club record seven consecutive defeats. McInnes was sacked on 12 January 2013, after a 4–0 home defeat to Leicester City left the club eight points adrift of safety. After being sacked by Bristol City, McInnes said that he was "very desperate" to succeed and that his time at Bristol City was difficult.

Aberdeen 

McInnes was appointed Aberdeen manager on 25 March 2013, with Tony Docherty as his assistant. He officially took charge of the team after a match against Dundee United on 6 April, with outgoing manager Craig Brown taking charge of the last two games before the late-season split. After the final game with Brown as manager, McInnes vowed to improve the club by helping the city of Aberdeen to "fall in love" with its football team again.

Aberdeen remained unbeaten in September 2013, winning twice and drawing once in the league and progressing to the quarter-final of the League Cup with a 5–0 win over Falkirk. The team's excellent form earned McInnes the Manager of the Month award for September.

The club had a positive start to 2014, taking maximum points from games against Dundee United, Kilmarnock and Hibernian. At the end of the month Russell Anderson scored in the 94th minute to level the game at 2–2 and secure a point for the Dons against Motherwell at Fir Park to keep them in second place. McInnes praised his players and believed they "showed good determination to get something from the game." He was rewarded for his efforts as he picked up the Manager of the month award for February. Ahead of the League Cup final, McInnes signed an extension to his contract, tying himself to the club until the summer of 2017.

Aberdeen won the 2014 Scottish League Cup Final 4–2 on penalties, after a goalless draw, a success that saw them lift their first trophy in 19 years. McInnes led Aberdeen to European qualification for the first time since 2009, achieved through a third-place finish in the league campaign. However, McInnes was unsatisfied with the outcome when Motherwell beat Aberdeen 1–0 to take the second place. McInnes criticised the referee for ignoring the challenge when goalkeeper Jamie Langfield was fouled by John Sutton, which later led to the goal scored by Craig Reid. At the end of the season, McInnes was awarded both PFA Scotland Manager of the Year and SFWA Manager of the Year.

Early in the 2014–15 season, Aberdeen progressed through two qualifying rounds of the UEFA Europa League, including an aggregate victory against Dutch club FC Groningen. Aberdeen finished second in the 2014–15 Scottish Premiership and again qualified for European competition. During the 2015 close season, despite mounting speculation that he was in talks to take over at Rangers, McInnes signed a new contract with the club keeping him at Pittodrie until 2019.

His Aberdeen team pushed Celtic almost all the way in the Scottish Premiership title race in 2015–16, with Celtic eventually beating Aberdeen 3–2 on 8 May 2016 to secured the league title with only two matches remaining. Aberdeen had begun that season winning all of their first eight league matches.

McInnes led Aberdeen to a third straight runners-up spot behind Celtic in season 2016–17. His Aberdeen side also claimed its first win at Ibrox since September 1991, with a 2–1 victory on 17 May. Aberdeen also reached both domestic cup finals, losing both to Celtic. The team went on a ten-match winning streak at Pittodrie, which surpassed Alex Ferguson's Aberdeen record of nine home wins in-a-row in 1985–86 (although not a club record). He was again shortlisted for PFA Scotland Manager of the Year, but lost out to Celtic manager Brendan Rodgers.

In June 2017, Aberdeen granted permission for Sunderland to speak with McInnes about becoming their manager, but he decided to stay with Aberdeen. McInnes and Docherty subsequently signed a 1-year contract extension, keeping them with the Dons until the summer of 2020. Rangers made an approach for McInnes in December 2017 (immediately following two league games in four days between the clubs, both won by the Glasgow side) but he rejected that offer as well.

McInnes was sent off by the referee for gesturing at Celtic fans during a 2018–19 Scottish Cup semi-final in April 2019. He was apparently reacting to sectarian abuse by Celtic fans, which was investigated by Police Scotland.

In July 2019 he signed a new contract with Aberdeen, due to run until 2022. After a poor run of results in early 2021, Aberdeen chairman Dave Cormack said that the board were "fully behind" McInnes. This run of form continued, as Aberdeen scored one goal in nine matches, and McInnes left the club by mutual consent on 8 March 2021.

Kilmarnock 
McInnes was appointed manager of Scottish Championship club Kilmarnock on an 18-month deal in early January 2022.
On 22 April of the same year McInnes took Kilmarnock back to the Premiership by beating Arbroath 2–1 at Rugby Park to win the Championship title.

Career statistics

Player

Managerial record

Honours

Player
Greenock Morton
Scottish Second Division: 1994–95

Rangers
Scottish Premier Division: 1996–97 
Scottish Cup: 1998–99

West Bromwich Albion
Football League First Division runner-up: 2001–02

Dundee United
Scottish Cup: Runner-up 2005

St Johnstone
Scottish Challenge Cup: 2007–08

Manager
St Johnstone
Scottish First Division: 2008–09

Aberdeen
Scottish League Cup: 2013–14
Runners-up 2016–17, 2018–19
Scottish Cup: Runners-up 2016–17

Kilmarnock
Scottish Championship: 2021–22

References

External links 

St Johnstone FC profile
 
 

1971 births
Aberdeen F.C. managers
Bristol City F.C. managers
Dundee United F.C. players
Expatriate footballers in France
Greenock Morton F.C. players
Living people
Millwall F.C. players
Premier League players
Rangers F.C. players
Scotland international footballers
Scottish expatriate footballers
Scottish Football League managers
Scottish Football League players
Scottish football managers
Scottish footballers
Scottish Premier League managers
Scottish Premier League players
Scottish Professional Football League managers
Footballers from Paisley, Renfrewshire
St Johnstone F.C. managers
St Johnstone F.C. players
Stockport County F.C. players
English Football League managers
English Football League players
Toulouse FC players
West Bromwich Albion F.C. players
Association football midfielders
Kilmarnock F.C. managers